Perittia ramona is a moth in the family Elachistidae. It was described by Lauri Kaila in 2000. It is found in Argentina.

References

Moths described in 2000
Elachistidae
Moths of South America